Miguel Alejandro Company Chumpitazi (born January 12, 1945) is a Peruvian football coach, ex-football player (1965–1973), and sports reporter.

Playing career
Company didn't have a great track record during his playing days. He did manage to play for notable teams such as Chiclayo based club Juan Aurich and José Gálvez FBC of Chimbote around the 1970s.

Managerial career
In the early 1980s Company contributed to Peruvian magazine Ovación by interviewing football figures such as César Luis Menotti. Then in 1985 he would start his managerial career with Asociación Deportiva Tarma in the 1985 Torneo Descentralizado season. In his first two years as a manager he coached several clubs in a very short time such as Juventud La Joya, Colegio Nacional de Iquitos, Hungaritos Agustinos, and Unión Huaral.

Then in 1987 Company had his first experience in charge of a big Peruvian club, Sporting Cristal. Lasting only one year and a half, he was in charge of the Celestes for the 1987 Torneo Descentralizado which extended into early 1980 and left before the start of the 1988 Torneo Descentralizado. He did however manage to win his first trophy with Sporting Cristal in the 1988 Marlboro Cup tournament.

Company then went on to have a short spell with Alianza Lima in the 1989 Torneo Descentralizado. He helped the club to a strong start to the season but then later struggled in the second half. Then he was in charge of Sport Boys for 1990 Torneo Descentralizado and led the club to a Copa Libertadores groupstage place by winning the Liguilla Final. He left right after and came back for the 1991 season only to leave again a few months later.

Company then managed the Peru national football team in two Copa America tournaments (1991 and 1995). In both editions of the Copa America, he could not lead Peru out of the first group stage. During the 1991 edition he had physical altercations with a journalist and later with his player, Andrés Gonzales, who refused to play against Paraguay. Gonzales was later banned from playing for Peru for two years.

He was also in charge of the Honduras national football team in 1997 and 1998, and the Cuba national football team from 2000 to 2004. In terms of national clubs, he led the Peruvian team Universitario de Deportes to a Torneo Apertura cup in 1999.

Honours

Manager
Sporting Cristal
1988 Marlboro Cup

Universitario de Deportes
Torneo Apertura: 1999

References

External links 

1945 births
Living people
Footballers from Lima
Association football defenders
Peruvian footballers
Juan Aurich footballers
José Gálvez FBC footballers
Peruvian football managers
Sporting Cristal managers
Club Alianza Lima managers
Sport Boys managers
Peru national football team managers
Deportivo Cali managers
C.D. Veracruz managers
Honduras national football team managers
Club Universitario de Deportes managers
Deportivo Saprissa managers
Cuba national football team managers
1991 Copa América managers
1995 Copa América managers
Peruvian expatriate football managers
Expatriate football managers in Colombia
Expatriate football managers in Honduras
Expatriate football managers in Mexico
Expatriate football managers in Cuba
Expatriate football managers in Costa Rica